Club Deportivo Muxes is a Mexican football club that plays in the Liga TDP, the Mexican third division. The club is based in Venustiano Carranza, Mexico City. It is the first professional Mexican football club declared as LGBT.

History
The team was founded in 2018 with the aim of representing the LGBT community that until then had not had a representative club, in addition to generating spaces for the visibility of these groups. In its origins, the team competed in amateur leagues in Mexico City.

In 2020 the team joined the Mexican Football Federation, Subsequently, the club registered in the Liga TDP, being placed in Group IV with other teams from the Greater Mexico City.

On 25 September 2020, the team played its first official match. Muxes defeated FC Politécnico by a score of 0–4. Pablo de la Rosa scored the club's first goal in its history in professional competition.

Players

First-team squad

See also
Futbol in Mexico
Mexico City
Tercera División de México

References

External links

Liga MX Profile

Football clubs in Mexico City
2018 establishments in Mexico
LGBT sports organizations
LGBT culture in Mexico